Deià...Vu is the eleventh studio album by Kevin Ayers, recorded in December 1980 and released in Spain after a remix in August 1984. It was recorded at Estudios Maller, Palma de Mallorca, with his local backing band led by Joan Bibiloni, and includes his musical partner Ollie Halsall.  The title refers to the Spanish village Deià, Majorca.

Track listing
 "Champagne and Valium" (Kevin Ayers) – 5:18
 "Thank God for a Sense of Humor" (Ayers) – 3:52
 "Take It Easy" (Ayers) – 2:59
 "Stop Playing with My Heart (You Are a Big Girl)" (Ayers) – 3:33
 "My Speeding Heart" (Ayers) – 2:59
 "Lay Lady Lay" (Bob Dylan) – 5:00
 "Stop Playing With My Heart II" (Ayers) – 2:47
 "Be Aware of the Dog" (Ayers) – 4:49

Personnel

Musicians
 Kevin Ayers – lead vocals, guitar
 Joan Bibiloni – guitars
 Ollie Halsall – bass, guitar (7)
 Daniel Lagarde – bass
 Quique Villafania – drums
 Miguel Figuerola – drums
 Zanna Gregmar – keyboards, backing vocals
 Jorge Pardo – saxophone
 Linda Novit – backing vocals

Technical
 Kevin Ayers – producer
 Joan Bibiloni – producer
 Reinaldo Costantini – engineer
 Olaguer Armengol – photography

References

Original LP sleevenotes

1984 albums
Kevin Ayers albums